Hockey- und Tennisclub Uhlenhorst e.V. Mülheim, also known as HTC Uhlenhorst Mülheim, is a German field hockey club based in Mülheim, North Rhine-Westphalia. They are one of the most successful German field hockey clubs having won nine European titles between 1988 and 1996. They have also won the most Bundesliga titles with 18.

Honours

Men
Bundesliga
 Winners (18): 1949–50, 1953–54, 1954–55, 1956–57, 1957–58, 1959–60, 1963–64, 1984–85, 1985–86, 1986–87, 1987–88, 1989–90, 1990–91, 1993–94, 1994–95, 1996–97, 2017–18, 2018–19
 Runners-up (10): 1950–51, 1952–53, 1958–59, 1960–61, 1988–89, 1991–92, 1995–96, 2010–11, 2012–13, 2019–2021
EuroHockey Club Champions Cup
 Winners (9): 1988, 1989, 1990, 1991, 1992, 1993, 1994, 1995, 1996
 Runners-up (1): 1986
Indoor Bundesliga
 Winners (3): 1986–87, 2013–14, 2015–16
 Runners-up (2): 1984–85, 2012–13
EuroHockey Indoor Club Cup
 Winners (2): 2015, 2017

Women
Indoor Bundesliga
 Runners-up (1): 2014–15

Current squad

Men's squad

Women's squad

References

External links
Official website

 
Field hockey clubs established in 1920
Field hockey clubs in Germany
1920 establishments in Germany
Sport in Mülheim